Bruce Codron (born April 14, 1983) is a French kickboxer who trains in Mazan, France. He is the W.K.N., I.S.K.A. and W.A.K.O. World Full-Contact Champion. Also he is three time French Full-Contact Champion.

Biography and career
Bruce Codron trains at Gym Boxe Loisirs in Mazan with his trainer David Blanc and fight in full-contact, kickboxing and K-1 rules. He is a very physical fighter who loves links foot-fist-foot.

He lost to Abdallah Mabel via third-round TKO due to doctor stoppage at Nuit des Champions in Marseilles on November 24, 2012.

At La 20ème Nuit des Champions -68.5 kg/151 lb tournament in Marseille, France on November 23, 2013, Codron defeated both Cédric Castagna and Abdellah Ezbiri on points to win the title.

Titles and accomplishments
 2014 W.K.N. K1 Rules World Champion (69.900 kg) 
 2014 World GBC Tournament Champion (-70 kg)
 2013 NDC K-1 Rules -68.5 kg Tournament Champion
 2012 W.K.N. K1 Rules European Champion (69.900 kg)
 2012 Urban Boxing K1 belt (-70 kg)
 2011 W.K.N. Full-Contact World Champion (69.900 kg)
 2011 World GBC Tour 4 men Tournament champion (69.900 kg)
 2011 Nuit des Champions Full-Contact belt (-70 kg)
 5x W.K.N. Full-Contact World Champion
 3x W.A.K.O. Full-Contact World Champion
 3x W.K.N. Full-Contact World Champion
 I.S.K.A. Full-Contact World Champion
 3x Full-Contact French Champion
 La Nuit des Titans Tournament Champion

Kickboxing record

|-  bgcolor="#FFBBBB"
|2016-11-19||Loss||align=left| Chingiz Allazov  || Nuit Des Champions 2016 || Pairs, France||KO (Left High Kick and Punches)|| 4 ||1:04
|-
! style=background:white colspan=9 |
|-  bgcolor="#CCFFCC"
| 2015-10-10 || Win ||align=left| Akihiro Gono || World GBC Tour 9 || Mazan, France || Decision || 3 || 3:00
|-
|-  bgcolor="#FFBBBB"
| 2014-11-22 || Loss ||align=left| Abdellah Ezbiri || La 21ème Nuit des Champions, Semi Finals  || Marseille, France || Ext. R. Decision (Split) || 4 || 3:00
|-
|-  bgcolor="#CCFFCC"
| 2014-10-04 || Win ||align=left| Mirkko Moisar || GBC - World Tour 7 || Mazan, France || Decision || 5 || 3:00
|-
! style=background:white colspan=9 |
|-
|-  bgcolor="#CCFFCC"
| 2014-02-15 || Win ||align=left| Mohamed Houmer || World GBC Tour, Final || Pernes-les-Fontaines, France || Decision || 3 || 3:00
|-
! style=background:white colspan=9 |
|-
|-  bgcolor="#CCFFCC"
| 2014-02-15 || Win ||align=left| Antonio Gomez || World GBC Tour, Semi finals || Pernes-les-Fontaines, France || Decision || 3 || 3:00
|-
|-  bgcolor="#CCFFCC"
| 2013-11-23 || Win ||align=left| Abdellah Ezbiri || La 20ème Nuit des Champions, Final || Marseilles, France || Decision || 3 || 
|-
! style=background:white colspan=9 |
|-
|-  bgcolor="#CCFFCC"
| 2013-11-23 || Win ||align=left| Cédric Castagna || La 20ème Nuit des Champions, Semi finals || Marseilles, France || Decision || 3 || 
|-
|-  bgcolor="#FFBBBB"
| 2012-11-24 || Loss ||align=left| Abdallah Mabel || Nuit des Champions || Marseilles, France || TKO (doctor stoppage) || 3 || 
|-
|-  bgcolor="#CCFFCC"
| 2012-10-13 || Win ||align=left| Mohamed El-Mir || World GBC Tour || Mazan, France || Decision || 5 || 3:00
|-
! style=background:white colspan=9 |
|-
|-  bgcolor="#CCFFCC"
| 2012-05-19 || Win ||align=left| Nizar Gallas || Urban Boxing United || Marseilles, France || Decision || 3 || 3:00
|-
! style=background:white colspan=9 |
|-
|-  bgcolor="#CCFFCC"
| 2012-03-17 || Win ||align=left| Fréderic Diaz || 9ème Trophée de l’Ephèbe || Agde, France || KO || 2 || 
|-
|-  bgcolor="#CCFFCC"
| 2012-02-25 || Win ||align=left| Nizar Gallas || Stars Night || Vitrolles, France || Decision || 3 || 3:00
|-
|-  bgcolor="#CCFFCC"
| 2011-12-10 || Win ||align=left| Ivo Petrov || Full Night V || Agde, France || KO || 2 || 
|-
|-  bgcolor="#CCFFCC"
| 2011-11-12 || Win ||align=left| Ludovic Millet || La 18ème Nuit des Champions || Marseille, France || Decision || 7 || 2:00
|-
! style=background:white colspan=9 |
|-
|-  bgcolor="#CCFFCC"
| 2011-10-08 || Win ||align=left| Mario Agatic || World GBC Tour, Final || Mazan, France || KO || 4 || 
|-
! style=background:white colspan=9 |
|-
|-  bgcolor="#CCFFCC"
| 2011-10-08 || Win ||align=left| Data Javakhia || World GBC Tour, Semi Final || Mazan, France || KO || 3 || 
|-
|-  bgcolor="#CCFFCC"
| 2011-05-07 || Win ||align=left| Ricardo Luiz || La 7ème Nuit des Sports de Combat || Petit-Lancy, Switzerland || TKO (Referee Stoppage) || 6 || 
|-
|-  bgcolor="#CCFFCC"
| 2011-03-19 || Win ||align=left| Modibo Diarra || Boxe In Défi XII || Muret, France || Decision || 12 || 2:00
|-
! style=background:white colspan=9 |
|-
|-  bgcolor="#CCFFCC"
| 2011-02-19 || Win ||align=left| Milos Vesovic || Stars Night || Vitrolles, France || KO || 3 || 
|-
|-  bgcolor="#CCFFCC"
| 2010-11-26 || Win ||align=left| Cédric Castagna || La 17ème Nuit des Champions || Marseilles, France || Decision || 12 || 2:00
|-
! style=background:white colspan=9 |
|-
|-  bgcolor="#CCFFCC"
| 2010-10-02 || Win ||align=left| Gary Hamilton || Gym Boxe Challenge 10 || Mazan, France || Decision || 12 || 2:00
|-
! style=background:white colspan=9 |
|-
|-  bgcolor="#CCFFCC"
| 2010-02-27 || Win ||align=left| Ibrahim Konaté || La Nuit du Punch || Dinard, France || Decision || 7 || 2:00
|-
|-  bgcolor="#c5d2ea"
| 2009-11-14 || Draw ||align=left| Samir Mohamed || La 16ème Nuit des Champions || Marseille, France || Decision draw || 12 || 2:00
|-
! style=background:white colspan=9 |
|-
|-  bgcolor="#CCFFCC"
| 2009-10-17 || Win ||align=left| Raul Gonzalez || Gym Boxe Challenge 9 || Mazan, France || KO || 2 || 
|-
|-  bgcolor="#CCFFCC"
| 2008-11-29 || Win ||align=left| Samir Berbachi || La 15ème Nuit des Champions || Marseilles, France || Decision || 12 || 2:00
|-
! style=background:white colspan=9 |
|-
|-  bgcolor="#CCFFCC"
| 2008-03-08 || Win ||align=left| Mario Stassi || Power Trophy || Châteaurenard, France || TKO || 6 || 
|-
! style=background:white colspan=9 |
|-
|-  bgcolor="#CCFFCC"
| 2007-11-03 || Win ||align=left| Joseph Yaucat-Guendi || Gym Boxe Challenge || Mazan, France || Decision || 12 || 2:00
|-
! style=background:white colspan=9 |
|-
|-  bgcolor="#CCFFCC"
| 2006-11-25 || Win ||align=left| Cédric Castagna || La 13ème Nuit des Champions || Marseilles, France || Decision (Majority) || 5 || 2:00
|-
|-  bgcolor="#CCFFCC"
| 2006-03-04 || Win ||align=left| Patrick Kinigamazi || Championnat d'Europe || Châteaurenard, France || Decision ||  || 
|-
! style=background:white colspan=9 |
|-
|-  bgcolor="#FFBBBB"
| 2003-11-15 || Loss ||align=left| Wannai Pongpila || La 10ème Nuit des Champions || Marseilles, France || Decision || 5 || 2:00
|-
|-
| colspan=9 | Legend:

See also 
List of male kickboxers

References

Living people
French male kickboxers
French Muay Thai practitioners
1983 births